Cantalupa is a comune (municipality) in the Metropolitan City of Turin in the Italian region Piedmont, located about  southwest of Turin, at the foot of Monte Freidour.

Cantalupa borders the following municipalities: Cumiana, Frossasco, and Roletto.

References

External links
 Official website

Cities and towns in Piedmont